R v Storrey [1990] 1 S.C.R. 241 is a leading decision of the Supreme Court of Canada on the authority of police officers to make arrests. In addition to an officer's subjective belief that there are reasonable and probable grounds for arrest, the Court stipulated the grounds must be objectively justifiable.

In his judgement, Cory J. followed R v Brown (1987 NSCA) and Liversidge v Anderson in stating:
''...the Criminal Code requires that an arresting officer must subjectively have reasonable and probable grounds on which to base the arrest.  Those grounds must, in addition, be justifiable from an objective point of view.  That is to say, a reasonable person placed in the position of the officer must be able to conclude that there were indeed reasonable and probable grounds for the arrest.  On the other hand, the police need not demonstrate anything more than reasonable and probable grounds.  Specifically, they are not required to establish a prima facie case for conviction before making the arrest.

References

External links
 

 Canadian criminal procedure case law
 Supreme Court of Canada cases
 Law enforcement in Canada
1990 in Canadian case law